Nicolás Levalle (1840-1902) was an Argentine military officer, who took part in several military campaigns, including the Battle of Cepeda, Battle of Pavón on occasion of civil wars, and the Battle of Pehuajó and Battle of Yatay, during the Paraguayan War.

Levalle was born in Chiavari, Genoa, Italy, the son of Lorenzo Levaggi and Benedicta Daneri, a noble family who arrived in Buenos Aires in 1842. He had an active participation in most armed conflicts that occurred in Argentina between 1852 and 1893. He was Commander in Chief of the General Staff of the 
Argentine Army, serving in that position from 1887 to 1890.

Nicolás Levalle was the founder Argentine Military Circle, and served for several periods as Minister of War and Navy of the Argentine Republic. He was also in command of the 2° Regimiento de Caballería de Línea, taking an active part in the campaigns against the Indians during the Conquest of the Desert.

References

External links 
Matrimonios 1864-1868

1840 births
1902 deaths
Italian emigrants to Argentina
People from Buenos Aires
Burials at La Recoleta Cemetery
Argentine generals
Argentine Army officers
Argentine military personnel